Stanley S. Harris (October 19, 1927 – August 13, 2021) was a former United States district judge of the United States District Court for the District of Columbia.

Early life and education

Born in Washington, D.C., Harris was the son of Hall of Fame manager Bucky Harris of the Washington Senators. He was in the United States Army in the aftermath of World War II, from 1945 to 1947. He received a Bachelor of Science degree from the University of Virginia in 1951 and a Bachelor of Laws from the University of Virginia School of Law in 1953, where he was an editor of the Virginia Law Review.

Career

He was in private practice in Washington, D.C. from 1953 to 1970, when he became a judge on the Superior Court of the District of Columbia from 1970 to 1972. He then served on the District of Columbia Court of Appeals from 1972 to 1982. In 1980, Harris was one of several more conservative judges, led by Frank Q. Nebeker, who attempted unsuccessfully to prevent the reappointment as chief judge of Theodore R. Newman Jr. He left the court to become the United States Attorney for the District of Columbia from February 5, 1982, to 1983, where he helped prosecute John Hinckley Jr.

Federal judicial service

On November 1, 1983, Harris was nominated by President Ronald Reagan to a seat on the United States District Court for the District of Columbia vacated by Judge John Lewis Smith Jr. Harris was confirmed by the United States Senate on November 11, 1983, and received his commission on November 14, 1983. He assumed senior status on February 1, 1996, and served in that capacity until June 2, 2001, when he retired.

Harris died on August 13, 2021, at his home.

References

Sources
 
 Interview with Hon. Stanley Harris, Oral History Project, Historical Society of the District of Columbia Circuit

1927 births
2021 deaths
20th-century American judges
Judges of the District of Columbia Court of Appeals
Judges of the Superior Court of the District of Columbia
Judges of the United States District Court for the District of Columbia
United States Army soldiers
United States Attorneys for the District of Columbia
United States district court judges appointed by Ronald Reagan
University of Virginia alumni
University of Virginia School of Law alumni
Woodrow Wilson High School (Washington, D.C.) alumni